The Hummelsberg is a mountain, on the southwestern edge of the Swabian Jura near Gosheim in the German county of Tuttlingen.

The Hummelsberg is part of the so-called ten thousanders – the ten mountains of the Swabian Jura that reach a height of 1,000 metres or more – in the area of the Großer Heuberg. Together with the Kehlen and the Hochwald, it forms a mountain chain that continues south as far as the Dreifaltigkeitsberg. In outstanding weather conditions the view from the Hummelsberg may reach the northernmost summits of the Swiss Alps to the south and the Black Forest to the west.

Mountains and hills of the Swabian Jura
One-thousanders of Germany